The Napp Research Centre is a large medical research institute in the north of Cambridge, and innovative-looking and award-winning architecture; it is a Cambridge landmark.

History
Cambridge Science Park was built in the early 1970s and is part of the Napp Pharmaceutical Group, a pharmaceutical firm that manufactures analgesic, oncology and respiratory products.

The grandiose innovative-looking building was designed in 1979 by the Canadian architect Arthur Erickson, and was completed in 1981. Staff moved in in 1983. Three more buildings were added in 2007. Stage D, E and F1 were added in 2012, designed by CPN Architects.

Prince Philip, Duke of Edinburgh visited the building on 6 February 1985. Princess Margaret visited the building on 19 October 1985. On 14 July 1988, the site was visited by the seventh President of Turkey, Kenan Evren. The King of Jordan, Abdullah II of Jordan, visited the site with Prince Andrew, Duke of York on 7 November 2001; the visit also included Zeus Technology.

The site works with Cambridge Academy for Science and Technology, a UTC.

Structure

The site is directly next to the A10/A14 interchange, in South Cambridgeshire.

Awards
In June 1984 it won The Concrete Society's Award.

See also
 Laboratory of Molecular Biology

References

External links
 Napp
 Cambridge Science Park
 Cambridge Innovation Park
 Cambridge Modern Architecture

1981 establishments in England
Buildings and structures in South Cambridgeshire District
Commercial buildings completed in 1981
Concrete buildings and structures
Glass buildings
Pharmaceutical industry in the United Kingdom
Pharmaceutical research institutes
Research institutes established in 1983
Research institutes in Cambridgeshire